Ableson is a surname. People with the surname include:

Bruce Ableson (born 1963), American computer programmer and website developer
Andrew Ableson, actor in the film, Boyfriends
Brad Ableson, film director who worked on Minions: The Rise of Gru and Legends of Chamberlain Heights''

See also
Abelson (a surname)